Grimsay, south east of Benbecula is a tidal island of the Outer Hebrides. It is connected to Benbecula by a causeway which carries the B891. In the 2001 census, Grimsay had a population of 19, and 20 in 2011.

An extension to the B891 now connects Grimsay to Eilean na Cille to the south east via a causeway. The road was built at a cost of £1,800 to service the pier at Peter's Port, which was constructed in 1896 at cost of £2,000 – although the anchorage is awkward and should not be used without local knowledge.

Notes

References
 

Uist islands
Tidal islands of Scotland